This is a list of mayors of Fribourg, Switzerland. The mayor  of Fribourg (French: syndic de Fribourg, German: Stadtammann or Ammann von Freiburg) presides the city's executive.

Fribourg
 
Lists of mayors (complete 1900-2013)